Dance Deewane is an Indian dance reality show that airs on Colors TV. The show features dance performers, including solo acts, Duo and groups representing any style of dance, competing for a grand prize.

The series premiered on Colors TV on 2 June 2018. The First season aired from 2 June 2018 to 15 September 2018, the second season aired from 15 June 2019 to 28 September 2019 and the third season aired from 27 February 2021 to 10 October 2021. Dance Deewane Juniors, the series' spin-off, aired from 23 April 2022 to 17 July 2022.

Synopsis 
Various talented dancers are divided into three age groups, called "generations". The first generation is the youngest while the third generation is the oldest. In the end, the best-performing dancers from each generation compete against each other in the finale. The dancers usually perform alongside choreographers.

Details

Judges & Hosts

Details

Contestants

 Eliminated
 Quit
 Finalist 
 1st Generation Winner
 2nd Generation Winner
 3rd Generation Winner 
 Gang Pratik-Winner
 Gang Sonali-Winner
 Gang Tushar-Winner
 Ultimate Winner

References

External links 

 Dance Deewane at IMDb

2018 Indian television series debuts
Colors TV original programming
Indian dance television shows
Indian reality television series
Dance competition television shows
Hindi-language television shows